Gérson Alencar de Lima Júnior (born 13 June 1985), known as Gérson Magrão, is a Brazilian footballer who plays as an attacking midfielder for Ituano.

Magrão has played professionally in Brazil, the Netherlands, Ukraine and Portugal.

Career
Born in Diadema, Gérson Magrão started his career with Cruzeiro in 2004 but didn't make a league appearance before leaving to join Dutch Eredivisie club Feyenoord, he remained with the Rotterdam club until 2007 when he left to return to Brazil after appearing in just six league matches. On his return to Brazil, Gérson Magrão had a short stint with Flamengo before signing with Ipatinga for two years. He played 26 times for Ipatinga and scored his first professional league goal in a 4–2 defeat away to Atlético Mineiro on 13 June 2008. After this, he returned to his first professional club, Cruzeiro, where he made 28 appearances between 2008 and 2009, he scored twice for the club during that time. He made his Copa Libertadores debut with Cruzeiro on 19 March 2009 against Club Universitario.

In 2009, Gérson Magrão left Brazil for the second time in his career as he agreed to join Ukrainian side Dynamo Kyiv, who were the defending Premier League champions at the time. He made his Dynamo debut on 23 August against Vorskla Poltava, three weeks later he received his first career red card in a Ukrainian Cup match versus Metalist Kharkiv. Things improved for Gérson Magrão later that month as he played and scored on his UEFA Champions League debut on 16 September against Rubin Kazan, he played in all six of Dynamo's 2009–10 group stage fixtures as the club finished bottom of a group that also included Barcelona and Inter Milan. He made a total of 28 appearances in his debut season with Dynamo. He made just 10 appearances for Dynamo in their 2010–11 season before departing the club at the beginning of the 2011–12 season.

Gérson Magrão spent the 2012 season with Santos, before playing with Figueirense for the 2013 season. He signed for Portuguese club Sporting CP in July 2013. Magrão left Sporting in May 2014, after only one season with the club after making just ten appearances in all competitions; during his time in Portugal he played five times and scored one for Sporting CP B. On 30 April 2015, Gérson Magrão joined Série B side CRB. He made 19 appearances and scored twice for CRB during 2015 in Série B, whilst also making one appearance in the Copa do Brasil. In 2016, Gérson Magrão signed for Piracicaba and made his debut for the team on 17 February in the Campeonato Paulista. In total, he made 5 appearances and scored once (in his penultimate appearance against São Bernardo) before leaving on 12 April.

Honours
Flamengo
Campeonato Carioca: 2007

Cruzeiro
Campeonato Mineiro: 2009

Santos
Campeonato Paulista: 2012
Recopa Sudamericana: 2012

CRB
Campeonato Alagoano: 2015

América Mineiro
Campeonato Brasileiro Série B: 2017

References

1985 births
Living people
Brazilian footballers
Brazilian expatriate footballers
Cruzeiro Esporte Clube players
Feyenoord players
CR Flamengo footballers
Ipatinga Futebol Clube players
FC Dynamo Kyiv players
Santos FC players
Figueirense FC players
Sporting CP footballers
Clube de Regatas Brasil players
Esporte Clube XV de Novembro (Piracicaba) players
América Futebol Clube (MG) players
Associação Atlética Ponte Preta players
Eredivisie players
Campeonato Brasileiro Série A players
Campeonato Brasileiro Série B players
Ukrainian Premier League players
Expatriate footballers in the Netherlands
Expatriate footballers in Ukraine
Expatriate footballers in Portugal
Brazilian expatriate sportspeople in the Netherlands
Brazilian expatriate sportspeople in Ukraine
Brazilian expatriate sportspeople in Portugal
Association football midfielders
Footballers from São Paulo (state)
People from Diadema